Stalins Brigade ('Stalin's Brigade') was a Volga German communist newspaper, published from Kukkus between 1936 and 1941. Stalins Brigade was the joint organ of the Kukkus local committee of the All-Union Communist Party (bolshevik) and the Kukkus Executive Committee.

References

Volga German diaspora
German-language communist newspapers
Newspapers published in the Soviet Union
German-language newspapers published in Europe